The Bezirk Karl-Marx-Stadt, also known as Bezirk Chemnitz, was a district (Bezirk) of East Germany. The district would last from 1952 up to the Reunification of Germany in 1990. The administrative seat and the main town was Karl-Marx-Stadt, renamed back to Chemnitz during the reunification of Germany.

History
The Chemnitz District (renamed, with the city, after Karl Marx on 10 May 1953) was established, with the other 13, on 25 July 1952,  substituting the old German states. After 3 October 1990, it was disestablished due to the German reunification, its territory becoming again part of the state of Saxony.

Geography

Position
The Bezirk Karl-Marx-Stadt, corresponded to the area of the actual Direktionsbezirk Chemnitz and the southernmost one of DDR, bordered with the Bezirke of Gera, Leipzig and Dresden. It bordered also with Czechoslovakia and West German Upper Franconia.

Subdivision
The Bezirk was divided into 26 Kreise: 5 urban districts  (Stadtkreise) and 21 rural districts (Landkreise): 
Urban districts : Johanngeorgenstadt; Karl-Marx-Stadt; Plauen; Schneeberg; Zwickau.
Rural districts : Annaberg; Aue; Auerbach; Brand-Erbisdorf; Flöha; Freiberg; Glauchau; Hainichen; Hohenstein-Ernstthal; Karl-Marx-Stadt-Land; Klingenthal; Marienberg; Oelsnitz; Plauen-Land; Reichenbach; Rochlitz; Schwarzenberg; Stollberg; Werdau; Zschopau; Zwickau-Land.

See also
Direktionsbezirk Chemnitz
Administrative divisions of East Germany
Bezirk Dresden
Bezirk Leipzig

References

External links

Karl Marx Stadt
Bezirk Karl Marx Stadt
Zwickau
History of Chemnitz
Karl Marx
Former states and territories of Saxony
Freiberg